National Metallurgical Academy of Ukraine (NMetAU; formerly DMetl, Dnipropetrovsk Metallurgical Institute) is a university in Dnipro dedicated to the study of metallurgy.

History 
National Metallurgical Academy of Ukraine is the oldest higher metallurgical educational institution of Ukraine. It was founded as a factory department of the Ekaternoslav Higher Mining School in October 1899. In 1912, the department was transformed into the metallurgical faculty of the Mining Institute, which later became the Dnipro Metallurgical Institute in 1930. In 1993, the Resolution of the Cabinet of Ministers of Ukraine granted the Institute the status of a state university. In 1999, the Decree of the President of Ukraine granted it the status of the National Academy.

Academics
There are 13 schools focusing on various scientific disciplines in the academy. Some examples of subjects studied are iron and steel metallurgy, thermal engineering, metallurgical equipment, and metalworking.

The Academy is a part of many international programs, such as Erasmus, TEMPUS, and DAAD. The Academy also participates in the Bologna Process.

Schools

 Faculty of Humanities
 Faculty of Metallurgy
 Faculty of Mechanical Engineering
 Special faculty of retraining of specialists
 Faculty of continuous education
 Faculty of Computer Systems, Energy and Automation
 Faculty of Materials Science and Metalworking
 Faculty of advanced training of teachers and specialists
 Faculty of Economics and Management
 Faculty of Electrometallurgy
 Kryvyi Rih Metallurgical Faculty Site
 Nikopol Technical School of NMetAU

Rankings
NMetAU has a high ranking among Ukrainian universities, often placed in the top 20 or top 10 schools.

Rating of Ukraine universities III, IV accreditation levels "Top 200" Ukraine
2009 – 18th place
2010 – 16th place
2011 – 17th place

Rating of Ukraine universities in Ukraine "Compass 2012"
2010 – 7th place
2011 – 7th place
2012 – 7th place

The national system of ranking evaluation of higher education institutions: Technical universities 2012 – 8th place

Notable alumni 

 Ihor Kolomoyskyi, Ukrainian billionaire, business oligarch, one of the founders of the Privat Group.
 Yury Mukhin, Soviet engineer, inventor and the top manager of the metallurgical industry.
 Victor Pinchuk, Ukrainian businessman and oligarch.
 Serhiy Tihipko, Ukrainian politician and finance specialist
 Oleksandr Turchynov, Ukrainian politician, former acting President of Ukraine (2014) and Secretary of the National Security and Defence Council of Ukraine.
 Andriy Khvetkevych, Ukrainian and American world-class freediver.

References

External links

Universities in Ukraine
1899 establishments in the Russian Empire
Educational institutions established in 1899